The Nashua Broadcaster was a newspaper in Nashua, New Hampshire, United States. It is owned by MediaNews Group.

It ceased publication in 2011.

References

External links
Official website (broken link)

Newspapers published in New Hampshire
Weekly newspapers published in the United States